Cempoala or Zempoala (Nahuatl Cēmpoalātl 'Place of Twenty Waters') is an important Mesoamerican archaeological site located in the Úrsulo Galván Municipality, in the state of Veracruz, Mexico.  The site was inhabited mainly by Totonacs, Chinantecas and Zapotecs.  It was one of the most important Totonac settlements during the postclassical Mesoamerican period and the capital of the kingdom of Totonacapan.  It is located one kilometer from the shore of the Actopan River and six kilometres from the coast.

Cempoala was the first urban settlement the Spaniards saw upon arrival on the American continent.

According to some sources, the city was founded at least 1,500 years before the Spanish arrival, and there is evidence of Olmec influence. Although not much is known about the Preclassical and Classic Era, the Preclassical town was built on mounds to protect it from floods.  The Totonacs moved into the area during the Toltec Empire peak,  having been forced out of their settlements on the eastern slopes of the Sierra Madre Oriental. The Totonacs ruled the area of Totonacapan which consisted of the northern part of Veracruz together with the Zacatlán district of Puebla with a total population of approximately 250,000 and some 50 towns. At its peak, Cempoala had a population of between 25,000 and 30,000.

Etymology

The word "Cēmpoalli" (from Nahuatl root "Cēmpoal) means twenty and "ā (tl)", means water, hence "twenty waters".  An alternative etymology suggests the name meant “Abundant Water”. Both versions imply that the city had many aqueducts which fed the numerous gardens and surrounding farmland fields.  A third version conjectures that the name referred to commercial activities which, according to some sources, were performed every 20 days in pre-Hispanic times.

History
Research by Vincent H. Malmström (Dartmouth College) describes an interesting astronomical relationship between the three round rings found at Cempoala.

The Totonacs moved onto this coastal plain during the height of the Toltec Empire (A.D. 1000–1150). Archaeologists believe the Toltecs had pushed the Totonacs out of their settlements on the eastern slopes of the Sierra Madre Oriental and down to the coast.
Here, on 27 May 1520, a battle was fought between the forces of Pánfilo de Narváez and the forces of Hernán Cortés, the latter which were supported by a small number of indigenous soldiers. See: Battle of Cempoala.

Cempoala lies on the flat coastal plain about six kilometers from the Gulf and a little more than a kilometer from the banks of the Rio Actopan (also called the Rio Chachalacas).

Alliance
Cempoala and other coastal Veracruz locations were defeated by the Aztec armies of Moctezuma I (mid-15th century). They were heavily taxed (goods and sacrifice prisoners) and forced them to send hundreds of people as a tribute for sacrifices and as slaves. This 
treatment at the hands of the Aztecs created the situation which led up to the defeat of the Aztecs by Cortés in the 16th century.

When the Spaniards, led by Hernán Cortés, arrived in 1519 the Totonacs had been suffering Aztec domination for several years.

The Spaniards heard of a town on the way named Zempoala while at their malaria-ridden camp of San Juan de Ulua. They marched over and sent word of their arrival, and upon their arrival were met by 20 Zempoalan dignitaries.

In town, they met with "Fat Chief" Xicomecoatl, who fed them and gave them quarters. The Totonac presented Cortés with numerous gifts, including gold jewelry.

Xicomecoatl made many complaints against the Aztec Empire and the great Montezuma.

Cortés promised alleviate his concerns. At Quiahuiztlan, the Spaniards and Totonacs forged their alliance against the Aztecs.

Spaniards and Totonacs shared the same goal. In August 1519, Cortés and 40 Totonac captains, which by a lower estimate equates to around 8000 soldiers, and 400 porters left for Tenochtitlan.  The effort ended with the fall of Tenochtitlan and Moctezuma II, the Aztec Tlatoani, as hostage.

Site

The Cempoala complex site is an assembly of impressive public spaces and fortress-like buildings surrounded by vegetation. The structures were built with stones from the nearby river, joined with mortar, and covered with lime made from burning shells and snails. This added a silver-like luster to their appearance when viewed from a distance.

As the political-religious center of the city, it included the "Place of accounts", as it was referred by the Mexica rulers, because it was where taxes and tributes from the region were collected.

Structures with often overlooked historic importance are in the part of the site now known as walled system IV. It was here that Cortés successfully faced the forces of Pánfilo de Narváez, thus consolidating his leadership in the colonization of the Mexican territory.

Structures
The main structures at Cempoala, include the following:

Templo del Sol or Great Pyramid
Or Sun Temple built on the same platform as the Templo Mayor, separated by an ample square. This is probably the most impressive structure on site. The great temple resembles the Sun Temple in Tenochtitlan. The Quetzalcoatl Temple, the Feathered Serpent God is a square platform, and the Ehécatl Temple, the wind God is round.

 Templo Mayor
The top part is surrounded by battlements.

 Templo de las Chimeneas
Or chimney temple, has a series of semicircular pillars 1.5 meters high, because of this peculiar shape, the building is named.

 El Pimiento
It has a three bodied structure, its most notable feature is its exterior decor based on skulls representations.

 Moctezuma's Palace
No information

 Templo de la Cruz
Or cross temple, maintains some fresco mural sections with celestial motifs.

 Templo Las Caritas
The so-called Temple of Charity standing about 200 meters to the east is a two-tier structure decorated with fragments of stucco reliefs. It is named for the hundreds of stucco skulls that once adorned the facade of a small structure at the base of the temple's staircase-archaeologists believe this complex was dedicated to the god of death.

It consists of two overlaid basements with top side elements, an open room, two decorative belts, the lower has murals depicting the sun, Moon and Venus, as early morning star, the higher section has a large amount of clay “little faces” or little skulls. The Structure is decorated with stucco faces on the walls and hieroglyphs painted in lower sections Gran Pirámide and the wind god Ehécatl worship altar.
  
 Other Mounds
There are other mounds, unexcavated, that cannot be visited, located within Cempoala current houses. Some of the structures there are probably built in the same style as were the residences of the prehispanic commoners.

Astronomy in Cempoala
Some research by Vincent H. Malmström of Dartmouth College describes an interesting astronomical relationship that exists because of the three round rings found at Zempoala. We will quote a part of his discussion concerning the Three Ceremonial Rings of Zempoala.

Beneath the massive pyramid (north eastern corner) in the central plaza of Zempoala, are three puzzling stone rings, each made from rounded beach cobbles jointed together to make small, stepped pillars. The largest rings has 40 stepped pillars, the middle ring has 28, and the smaller ring 13, around its circumference. It seems that three rings were used to calibrate different astronomical cycles, possibly by placing a marker or an idol from one pillar to the next, day after day.

The stone rings viewed from the top of the main pyramid, are surmounted by 13, 28, and 40 step like pillars, might have been counting devices to keep track of eclipse cycles, by Totonac priests.

It is possible that by using the rings, Totonacs priests were able to calibrate movements of the moon. There are reasons to believe these rings provide further evidence of the intellectual curiosity and architectural ingenuity of the early Mesoamericans."

History after 1519
Cempoala was a prosperous city, in which the Spaniards under Hernán Cortés arrived in Mexico and established alliances with some groups to go towards the capture of Tenochtitlan. The city of Cempoala then numbered approximately 20,000 inhabitants was the most important ceremonial and commercial center of the Aztec empire, more so than Tlatelolco. The Spaniards called it in Villa Viciosa, meaning fertile village by the many festivals and vast orchards and gardens available and festive and joyful inhabitants character. It was later known as new Seville for its resemblance, as per the spaniards, with the Iberian town.

Between 1575 and 1577 a smallpox (matlazahuatl) epidemic decimated the population, it is estimated that two million people lost their lives in Mesoamerica. The city was totally abandoned, and the few survivors moved to the city of Xalapa. The city was then lost to history until archeologist Francisco del Paso and Troncoso rediscovered it.

After the victory and conquest, the Cempoala Totonacs soon took their new destiny next to their foreign partners: were re-located and had to leave the city as  they were Christianized, banned from practicing their ancient cults and were turned into slaves to work new Spanish sugar cane fields.

Cortés first arrived at Zempoala in 1519 with 500 conquistadores who then made a long trip up into the highlands using the same routes used to haul maize to Tenochtitlan. His was added by the lord of Cempoala, known by his extraordinary corpulence as the "fat Cacique". The town was settled around walled perimeters delimiting temples and palaces; dating back to the 11th to 16th centuries.

References

Further reading
Archaeology of Native North America, 2010, Dean R. Snow, Prentice-Hall, New York. pp. 188

External links
 Catholic Encyclopaedia article on the Totonac Indians
 Article on the Cempoala site
 Cempoala, Mexico is a map from 1580

Mesoamerican sites
Archaeological sites in Mexico
Former populated places in Mexico
Archaeological sites in Veracruz
Totonac sites
Buildings and structures in Mesoamerica
Tourist attractions in Veracruz